Magy Nader Aziz (born 25 December 1987 in Cairo), also known as Magy Aziz, is an Egyptian tennis player.

Playing for Egypt at the Fed Cup, Aziz has a win–loss record of 26–21.

ITF Finals

Doubles (0–2)

ITF Junior Finals

Singles finals (9–1)

Doubles finals (6–4)

External links 
 Magy Nader Aziz
 
 

Egyptian female tennis players
1987 births
Living people
Sportspeople from Cairo
African Games gold medalists for Egypt
African Games medalists in tennis
African Games silver medalists for Egypt
Competitors at the 2011 All-Africa Games
Competitors at the 2007 All-Africa Games
African Games bronze medalists for Egypt
21st-century Egyptian women